Frans Verschoren (5 March 1874 – 5 December 1951) was a Flemish writer.

Biography
He was born in Sint-Katelijne-Waver in 1874. After his studies at the normal school, he became a teacher in Lier and in Turnhout. In Lier he had Felix Timmermans as a pupil. He then also became director of the Walcourt and later Boom state secondary schools. He was the author in particular of tales for young people. He died in Westmalle, Belgium, in 1951.

Bibliography
 Dompelaars (1909)
 Uit het Nethedal (1909)
 Jeugd (1910)
 Zonnig leven (1912)
 Langs kleine wegen (1912)
 Het gemartelde Lier. De eerste oorlogsjaren in het land van Sint-Gommarus (1919)
 Vlaamsche humor (1922)
 Onnozele kinderdag (1927)
 De dijkgravin (by Marie Gevers, translated from French, 1934)
 Tony Bergmann (1936)
 Verzoening (by Marie Gevers, translated from French, 1942)
 Armantje (by Hermann Claudius, translated from German, 1943)
 Sooike's jeugd (1944)
 Sam in Engeland (by C. Dowman, retold from English, 1946)
 Grijze dagen 
 Maandag vieren 
 Nonkel Sooi 
 Novellen voor de jeugd (together with other authors) 
 Van den roover Eyserentant 
 Van een jongen die geluk had

References

1874 births
1951 deaths
People from Sint-Katelijne-Waver
19th-century Belgian writers
20th-century Belgian writers
Flemish writers